Geeta Nargund (MBBS FRCOG London) is a professor, medical doctor, trainer, health writer, commentator, and pioneer in the field of natural and mild IVF and Advanced Technology in Reproductive Medicine.

Education and early career 
Nargund studied medicine at Karnataka Medical College (now Karnataka Institute of Medical Sciences) Hubli, India and at the Royal College of Obstetricians and Gynaecologists in London.

Medical career 
Nargund is the medical director of CREATE Fertility and an Honorary Professor of Women's Health at the University of Bolton, UK and Guest professor at Hasselt University Medical Faculty, Belgium. She is an accredited trainer for infertility and gynaecological ultrasound modules at the Royal College of Obstetricians and Gynaecologists (RCOG) London and the British Fertility Society (BFS). Additionally, she is senior consultant gynaecologist and lead consultant for reproductive medicine services at St George's Hospital. She has pioneered the use of follicular Doppler in assessing egg quality in humans. She has also published the first scientific paper on 'Cumulative conception and live birth rates in natural (unstimulated) IVF cycles'. As co-author, she won the 'Robert Edwards Prize' for best paper of the year 2014 for a paper on the innovative 'Simplified Culture System', which allows IVF to be performed without a conventional laboratory.

Nargund is the president of the International Society for Mild Approaches in Assisted Reproduction (ISMAAR), and was a member of the Steering Committee of the ESHRE Task Force on infertility in developing countries, holding the position of Chair of ESHRE Special Task Force on 'Mild ART'. She has been a member of the expert group in terminology for the World Health Organisation expert group in terminology in infertility and assisted reproductive technology (ART).

Nargund is the Founder and Trustee of Create Health Foundation, a UK national charity which is devoted to the promotion of an evidence-based, holistic and supportive approach to women's reproductive health through education and research. She sits on the medical advisory panel for Chana, a charity supporting fertility in the British Jewish community.  She is passionate about prevention of infertility, and protecting women’s health and safety during assisted conception treatment and has pioneered UK's first fertility education initiative in secondary schools.

Media career 
In the press, Nargund is a regular contributor to The Huffington Post and has appeared on Woman's Hour on BBC Radio 4. Among the many UK and international newspapers and magazines, she has commented and given opinion in The Daily Telegraph, The Independent, The Guardian, The Times, BBC, The Sun, ITV, Cosmopolitan, and the International Business Times UK. She is also an associate member of the Guild of Health Writers UK and is Co-Editor-in-Chief for the European scientific journal Facts, Views and Vision in ObGyn. She is on the international editorial board of the Journal of Human Reproductive Sciences.

Current posts 
 Medical Director at CREATE Fertility
 Elected as a trustee to the Board of British Red Cross in September 2017
 President of the International Scientific Society for Mild Approaches in Assisted Reproduction, a UK registered charity
 Director of The Walking Egg Foundation, a charity dedicated to global access to fertility care through innovation, education, and training
 Special consultant on the medical advisory panel for Chana, a charity supporting infertility in the British Jewish community
 Full member of the Guild of Health Writers UK
 Appointed as a member of the Board of Advisors for The Five Foundation, a global partnership to end FGM, in 2020
 Appointed as a Vice Chair of the British Red Cross from January 2021
 Honorary Professor of Women's Health, University of Bolton, UK
 Guest Professor, Hasselt University, Belgium
 Co-Founder, Ginsburg Women's Health Board 
 Authority Member, Human Fertilisation and Embryology Authority
 Senior NHS Consultant and Lead Consultant for Reproductive Medicine, St George's Hospital NHS Trust

Previous posts 
 Vice President for London for British Red Cross
 Member of the Steering Committee of the ESHRE Task Force on Infertility in developing countries
 Trustee of The London Emergencies Trust from July 2017 to January 2020
 Member of the Sterling Committee of the ESHRE Task Force on "Infertility in developing countries"

Honours and awards 
 2017 Special Award - Doctor of the Year - British Association for Physicians of Indian Origin
 2016 Top ten most influential Asian women in Britain - Asian Sunday Newspaper
2015 Daily Telegraph UK STEM Awards Hero
2015 Winner at annual Inspiration Awards for Women
2014 Winner of RBS Chairman’s Award for most outstanding candidate at the Asian Women of Achievement Awards 2014 for her work in advancing safer, more accessible fertility treatments in the UK and across the world
2013 Winner of Red Magazines Hot Women Award for charity work

Publications
 Development of in vitro maturation for human oocytes : natural and mild approaches to clinical infertility treatment, 2017
 Changes in practice make analysis of historical databases irrelevant for comparison between Natural and Stimulated IVF, 2017

References

Further reading

External links 
 TEDx Royal Holloway
 CREATE Fertility
 The International Society for Mild Approaches in Assisted Reproduction (ISMAAR)
 Chana
 Create Health Foundation
 Regular blogs on Huffington Post
 Guild of Health Writers

Living people
British gynaecologists
Year of birth missing (living people)